The Breda A.14 was a prototype three-engined biplane, designed by Società Italiana Ernesto Breda as a night bomber in 1928.

Design and development
The aircraft was proposed to the Regia Aeronautica, but failed assessments, and was abandoned. The aircraft was designed to solve the flight problems experienced on the A.8. The A.14 was tested in 1928, powered by three  Alfa Romeo Jupiter engines. Although performance was improved, the Regia Aeronautica decided not to accept the A.14. To make up for the costs, it was suggested that a demilitarised version be sold to civilians, but a lack of civilian interest resulted in the abandonment of the project.

Specifications

References

Further reading

A.14
1920s Italian bomber aircraft
Biplanes
Trimotors
Aircraft first flown in 1928